(English: they leave) may refer to:

 Exeunt Magazine, spun-off theatre section of musicOMH
 A stage direction, frequently used in the plays of William Shakespeare and other Elizabethan dramatists, meaning "persons leave the stage". It is notably found at the end of many acts and plays of Shakespeare.
 A command in the Shakespeare Programming Language

See also
Exeat, "he/she may leave"

Latin words and phrases